Turret spider is a common name for several spiders and may refer to:

Atypoides riversi, native to northern California

Set index articles on spiders